In the 2019–20 rugby union season, the  participated in the 2019–20 Pro14 competition, their third appearance since joining the competition in 2017–18.

Personnel

Coaches and management

The Southern Kings coaching and management staff for the 2019–20 Pro14 season are:

Squad

The Southern Kings squad for the 2019–20 Pro14 is:

Player movements

Player movements between the 2018–19 Pro14 season and the end 2019–20 Pro14 season are as follows:

During the season Chad Solomon joined the Kings on loan from the Stormers, De-Jay Terblanche rejoined the Kings on loan from the Pumas and Theo Maree joined from the Blue Bulls in November, Luyolo Dapula joined from the Free State XV and Robin Stevens joined from the Eastern Province Elephants in February, while Tiaan Botes was promoted from the Kings Academy in March.

Ahead of the resumption of the competition in August, the Kings announced an updated squad, with the additions of Nsuku Baloyi, Tharquinn Manuel, Tiaan Swanepoel, Gideon van Niekerk and Cameron Wright. Departing the team were JC Astle, Masixole Banda, Michael Botha, Brandon Brown, Demetri Catrakilis, Rossouw de Klerk, Schalk Ferreira, Tertius Kruger, Theo Maree, Siya Masuku, Lupumlo Mguca, Howard Mnisi, Sarel Pretorius, Robin Stevens, Stefan Ungerer and Xandré Vos who all left the team in this 5 month off period, while Juan Schoeman, Chad Solomon, De-Jay Terblanche and Scott van Breda returned to their parent clubs. However, due to the Kings entering voluntary liquidation in September, the team did not complete the season.

Standings

The final Conference B log standings were:

Round-by-round

The table below shows the Southern Kings' progression throughout the season. For each round, their cumulative points total is shown with the conference position:

Matches

The fixtures for the 2019–20 Pro14 were:

Following round 13 the league was suspended until 22 August due to the COVID-19 pandemic, with the Kings having entered voluntary liquidation before completing their fixtures.

Player statistics

The Pro14 appearance record for players that represented the Southern Kings in 2019–20 is as follows:

See also

 Southern Kings
 Pro14

References

Southern Kings seasons
Southern Kings
Southern Kings
Southern Kings